Monroe Township is the name of sixteen townships in Indiana:

 Monroe Township, Adams County, Indiana
 Monroe Township, Allen County, Indiana
 Monroe Township, Carroll County, Indiana
 Monroe Township, Clark County, Indiana
 Monroe Township, Delaware County, Indiana
 Monroe Township, Grant County, Indiana
 Monroe Township, Howard County, Indiana
 Monroe Township, Jefferson County, Indiana
 Monroe Township, Kosciusko County, Indiana
 Monroe Township, Madison County, Indiana
 Monroe Township, Morgan County, Indiana
 Monroe Township, Pike County, Indiana
 Monroe Township, Pulaski County, Indiana
 Monroe Township, Putnam County, Indiana
 Monroe Township, Randolph County, Indiana
 Monroe Township, Washington County, Indiana

See also
Monroe Township (disambiguation)

Indiana township disambiguation pages